The Borlaug Global Rust Initiative (BGRI - originally named the Global Rust Initiative) was founded in response to recommendations of a committee of international experts who met to consider a response to the threat the global food supply posed by the Ug99 strain of wheat rust. The BGRI was renamed the Borlaug Global Rust initiative in honor of Green Revolution pioneer and Nobel Peace Prize Laureate Dr. Norman Borlaug who worked to establish and lead the Global Rust Initiative.

The BGRI has the overarching objective of systematically reducing the world’s vulnerability to stem, yellow, and leaf rusts of wheat and advocating/facilitating the evolution of a sustainable international system to contain the threat of wheat rusts and continue the enhancements in productivity required to withstand future global threats to wheat.

Executive committee 
Chair: Jeanie Borlaug Laube

Permanent Members 
Ronnie Coffman (Cornell University), Vice Chairman of BGRI
Martin Kropf, Director General, CIMMYT, 
Trilochan Mohapatra, Director General, Indian Council of Agricultural Research, 
Mahmoud Solh Director General, ICARDA
Clayton Campanhola, Director of Agricultural Support Systems FAO

Rotating Members 
 John Manners, Director, CSIRO Agriculture
 David Wall, Acting Director Research, Development and Technology, Agriculture and Agri-Food Canada
 Huajin Tang, VP for International Collaboration, China Academy of Agricultural Sciences
 Lene Lange, Director of Research, Aalborg University, Denmark
 Fentahun Mengistu, Director General, Ethiopian Institute for Agricultural Research
 Abd El Moneam El Banna, President, Egyptian Agricultural Research Center
 Eskander Zand, Deputy Minister and Head, Agricultural Research, Education and Extension Organization, Iran
 Eliud Kireger, Director General, Kenya Agricultural and Livestock Research Organization
 Masum Burak, Director General of the General Directorate of Agricultural Research, Turkey
 Iftikhar Ahmad, Chairman, Pakistan Agricultural Research Council
 Jose Costa, Deputy Administrator, Crop Production and Protection, USDA-ARS
 Alvaro Roel, President, INIA, Uruguay

References

External links 
 Borlaug Global Rust Initiative website

Wheat diseases
Phytopathology
Agronomy
Plant breeding
Genetic engineering and agriculture